PF-514273 is a drug developed by Pfizer, which acts as an extremely selective antagonist for the CB1 receptor, with approximately 10,000x selectivity over the closely related CB2 receptor. This very high selectivity makes it useful for scientific research into these receptors, as many commonly used cannabinoid receptor antagonists also block the CB2 receptor to some extent.

References

Cannabinoids
CB1 receptor antagonists
Pfizer brands